The ninth edition of the Caribbean Series (Serie del Caribe) was played in 1957. It was held from February 9 through February 14, featuring the champion baseball teams of Cuba, Tigres de Marianao; Panama, Cerveza Balboa; Puerto Rico, Indios de Mayagüez, and Venezuela, Leones del Caracas. The format consisted of 12 games, each team facing the other teams twice. The games were played at Estadio del Cerro in Havana, the Cuban capital. The first pitch was thrown by Ford Frick, by then the Commissioner of Major League Baseball.

Summary 
The Cuban team was managed by Napoleón Reyes and finished with a 5–1 mark, with their only loss coming to Puerto Rico. Marianao offensive was clearly guided by Series MVP outfielder Solly Drake, who won the batting title with a .500 batting average and also led in runs (9), hits (11) and stolen bases (4).  Supporting him were fellow OF  Minnie Miñoso (.391, seven RBI, five runs) and catcher Hal Smith (.273, seven RBI). Pitcher Jim Bunning got two wins with a 0.61 ERA, including a seven-hit, one-run game and  scoreless innings of relief. Behind him were Mike Fornieles (1–0, 3.00), Bill Werle (1–1, 3.94) and Conrado Marrero (0–0, 2.70). Also in the roster were reliever Enrique Maroto and infielders Julio Bécquer, Harold Bevan and José Valdivielso.

Panama, managed by catcher León Kellman, posted a 3–3 record for a surprising second-place finish. Balboa most prominent player was Winston Brown, who pitched a six-hit, one run complete game and a four-hit shutout, in both cases against Venezuela. Another gem game from George Brunet (1–1, 17 SO, 1.76 ERA), who pitched the first shutout for a Panamanian team in Series history, and also hit one of the club's two homers. 1B Harold Gordon led the attack with a .412 BA. Other roster members included 2B Héctor López and P Dutch Romberger.

Puerto Rico tied with Venezuela for third place with a 2–4 mark. The Mayagüez team was piloted by Mickey Owen, while RF Canena Márquez provided the support attack (375, three HR, five runs, .792 SLG). The other major contributors were 1B Bob Speake (.391, one HR, five RBI, .652 SLG) and P José Santiago, who handed Marianao their only lost, throwing a three-hit shutout. Puerto Rico also featured 2B Bob Aspromonte, OF Bob Smith, and pitchers Herb Plews and Pete Wojey, among others.

Venezuela, guided by Clay Bryant, included C John Roseboro (.376 BA, .556 SLG); IFs Rudy Regalado (.292 BA), Pompeyo Davalillo (.381, three SB, four runs), Chico Carrasquel (.292, HR, .458 SLG) and Luis García (2-for-13, 2B, RBI), as well as OFs Tom Burgess (4-for-24) and Bob Wilson (4-for-22). Caracas pitchers Babe Birrer (1–1, 2.60) and Julián Ladera (1–0, 2.25) collected the only wins for the team in complete-game efforts. Emilio Cueche took a complete-game loss after giving up two unearned runs in Game 5, and later hurled two scoreless innings of relief for a perfect 0.00 ERA, the best for the Series.

Final standings

Scoreboards

Game 1, February 9

Game 2, February 9

Game 3, February 10

Game 4, February 10

Game 5, February 11

Game 6, February 11

Game 7, February 12

Game 8, February 12

Game 9, February 13

Game 10, February 13

Game 11, February 14

Game 12, February 14

See also 
 Ballplayers who have played in the Series

Sources 
 Antero Núñez, José. Series del Caribe. Jefferson, Caracas, Venezuela: Impresos Urbina, C.A., 1987.
 Gutiérrez, Daniel. Enciclopedia del Béisbol en Venezuela – 1895-2006 . Caracas, Venezuela: Impresión Arte, C.A., 2007.

External links 
Official site
Latino Baseball
Series del Caribe, Las (Spanish)
 
  
 

Caribbean
Caribbean Series
International baseball competitions hosted by Cuba
Baseball competitions in Havana
1957 in Caribbean sport
1957 in Cuban sport
20th century in Havana
Caribbean Series